WDNG Crshrs (pronounced Wedding Crashers) are an American hip hop duo from Atlanta, Georgia consisting of Quentin Miller, and Thaddeus "TheCoolisMac" Callaway. In 2015, they released the mixtapes, UTDinfinity and CrshrsGotWings with producer Cardo. In 2021, they released their album U2DINFINITI.

History

2014–present: UTDinfinity and CrshrsGotWings
Before they met, Callaway was working with Nick Miles, a producer that Miller would begin to build a working chemistry as well, they were all working out of the same studios. One day, Miller heard Callaway's music and told him to with enough fine tuning he could really be on to something so he should be a fly on the wall in one of his sessions to learn and actually ended up making a song together. Miller offered Callaway to stay with him for about six months since he had an extra room. During these sixth months, miller focused on recording and crafting new music while callaway fell in love with smoking marijuana and recording music videos . They also recorded music in 1317, which was the unit number to their friend Trice's apartment. It was also their gathering spot for them to hang out and have "real constructive meetings" with their college friends.

Callaway came up with the name "WDNG Crshrs" by being interested in the 2005 film Wedding Crashers. He also came up with the spelling. On February 14, 2015, WDNG Crshrs released their debut mixtape, UTDinfinity. The mixtape has no guest features and is entirely produced by Nick Miles. Cardo reached out to WDNG Crshrs on Instagram and told them he wanted to do a collaboration project called, CrshrsGotWings. That same day, he sent them many beats to their emails. On August 19, 2015, CrshrsGotWings was released. The mixtape has a sole appearance from Jay Dot Rain and production from Cardo, Yung Exclusive, and others.

Discography

Mixtapes

Singles

As lead artist

Guest appearances

Music videos

As lead artist

References

External links

WDNG Crshrs discography at Discogs

African-American musical groups
American musical duos
Hip hop duos
Musical groups from Atlanta
Musical groups established in 2014
Southern hip hop groups
2014 establishments in Georgia (U.S. state)